Hemipsilichthys nimius is a species of catfish belonging to the family Loricariidae. The species is only known from two small rivers in Rio de Janeiro State, Brazil: the Perequê-Áçu and the Taquari.

This is a fairly typical loricariid with a broad head and large mouth used for adhesion to rocks in fast-flowing water. It can be distinguished from all its congeners by the anatomy of the dorsal fin: eight branched rays are present instead of seven and there is a membrane connecting the last ray to the back of the fish.

References

 
 

Loricariidae
Catfish of South America
Fish of Brazil
Taxa named by Roberto Esser dos Reis
Fish described in 2003